Runtuqucha Q'asa (Quechua runtu egg, qucha lake, q'asa mountain pass, "egg lake pass", hispanicized spelling Runtocochajasa) is a mountain in the Willkapampa mountain range in the Andes of Peru, about  high. It is located in the Cusco Region,  Urubamba Province, Ollantaytambo District. Runtuqucha Q'asa lies southwest of Mount Wayanay. The Pukamayu ("red river"), an intermittent stream which later is called Kiskamayu ("thorn river"), flows along its eastern slopes. It is a right tributary of the Kusichaka River.

References

Mountains of Peru
Mountains of Cusco Region